Daine Laurie may refer to:
 Daine Laurie (rugby league, born 1999)
 Daine Laurie (rugby league, born 1984)